Martin Valentine Gannon (2 April 1919 – 6 August 1986) was an Irish Gaelic footballer and coach who played for club side Mullahoran and at senior level for the Cavan county team.

Career

Gannon was described in his obituary a goalkeeper of "exceptional ability". He first played with the Mullahoran club, winning a Cavan JFC title in 1940. He later won six Cavan SFC titles between 1942 and 1950. Gannon made his first appearance for the Cavan senior football team in the 1947 Ulster Championship. He ended the season by winning an All-Ireland Championship title after playing in goal in the 1947 All-Ireland final defeat of Kerry. Gannon won a second All-Ireland medal, albeit as a non-playing substitute, after a defeat of Mayo in the 1948 All-Ireland final. His other honours include two Ulster Championship medals and a National League title.

Personal life and death

Born in Ballina, County Mayo, Gannon was just four-years-old when his family moved to Mullahoran, County Cavan where his father worked as a railway stationmaster. Gannon later worked with CIÉ but left to work as a lorry driver.

Gannon died at St Joseph's Hospital in Cavan on 8 August 1986.

Honours

Mullahoran 
Cavan Senior Football Championship: 1942, 1944, 1945, 1947, 1948, 1950
Cavan Junior Football Championship: 1940

Cavan
All-Ireland Senior Football Championship: 1947, 1948
Ulster Senior Football Championship: 1947, 1945, 1948
National Football League: 1947–48

References

1919 births
1986 deaths
Mullahoran Gaelic footballers
Cavan inter-county Gaelic footballers
Gaelic football coaches
Gaelic football goalkeepers